Ipomea × multifida is a hybridogenic species. Its ancestors are I. coccinea and I. quamoclit (the cypress vine).

Its allotetraploid is Ipomoea sloteri. Both are known as cardinal climber.

References

multifida
Hybrid plants